The Lantingji Xu or Lanting Xu ("Orchid Pavilion Preface"), is a piece of Chinese calligraphy work generally considered to be written by the well-known calligrapher Wang Xizhi (303 – 361) from the Eastern Jin dynasty (317 – 420).

In the ninth year of the Emperor Yonghe (353 CE), a Spring Purification Ceremony was held at Lanting, Kuaiji Prefecture (today's Shaoxing, Zhejiang Province), where Wang was appointed as the governor at the time. During the event, forty-two literati gathered along the banks of a coursing stream and engaged in a "winding stream" drinking contest: cups of wine were floated on the water downstream, and whenever a cup stopped in front of a guest, he had to compose a poem or otherwise drink the wine. At the end of the day, twenty-six literati composed thirty-seven poems in total and the Lantingji Xu, as a preface to the collection was produced by Wang on the spot. The original preface was long lost, but multiple copies with ink on papers or stone inscriptions remain until today.

Form and content
The Lantingji Xu was written in the running (or semi-cursive) style on a cocoon paper with a weasel-whisker brush. It consists of 324 characters in 28 columns. The script of the Lantingji Xu was often celebrated as the high point of the running style in the history of Chinese calligraphy. The improvisational work demonstrated Wang’s extraordinary calligraphy skill with the elegant and fluent strokes in a coherent spirit throughout the entire preface. The character Zhi (“之”) also appeared 20 times but was never repeated to be the same.

Not only the aesthetic form of the manuscript is highly appreciated but also the transcendent sentiments expressed in the preface about life and death is a timeless classic. The preface starts off with a delightful description of the pleasant surroundings and the joyful ceremony, but carries on to reveal melancholy feelings towards how the transient delights brought by the vast universe would soon turn into retrospection. Wang reckoned the same emotion would be shared by the ancestors and his future generations even though the world and circumstances would be different. The scholars, who study Wang, refer to his ideology expressed in the preface as a fusion of the Confucianism, Buddhism and Taoism.

Original and copies of the Lantingji Xu 

The original of the Lantingji Xu was told to be completed by Wang in the state of insobriety. Wang tried to rewrite the preface but failed to create the same sublime beauty as the first time. When it came to the reign of the second Emperor from the Tang dynasty (618 – 907), Emperor Taizong (598? – 649) was an admirer of Wang’s calligraphy and he had collected approximately two-thousand pieces of Wang’s works. His tracking of the original Lantingji Xu became a widely circulated anecdote – the Emperor’s senior court official Xiao Yi was tasked to acquire the original from Bian Cai, a monk who inherited Wang’s Lantingji Xu from the friar Zhi Yong, the seventh grandson of Wang. Xiao managed to gain the trust from the monk and successfully spirited away the original work (Figure 1). The overjoyed Emperor shortly requested several court officials and calligraphers to copy the Lantingji Xu and upon Taizong’s death, the original was said to have been buried together in his mausoleum in Shaanxi Province.

Today, among the existing copies of the preface, a few outstanding imitations were attributed to Feng Chengsu (617 – 672), Ouyang Xun (557 – 641), Yu Shinan (558 – 638) and Chu Suiliang (596 – 659) from the Tang dynasty. Feng’s version, also called the Shenlong version (Figure 2), was regarded as the closest resemblance to the original. Feng, as the royal copyist, mastered the calligraphy tracing technique which was named Xiang Tuo. The method requires the copyist to stay in a dark room and stick the artwork against a window where the sunlight can shine through the paper to expose every detail of the characters; Another empty paper is then attached to the original piece to trace the outline of each stroke meticulously before filling in with ink. The Shenlong version is currently preserved at the Palace Museum in Beijing.

Authenticity of the Lantingji Xu
Given there is not a single piece of original work of Wang survived in our time, the authenticity of the Lantingji Xu has been a subject of controversy particularly from the Qing Dynasty (1644 – 1912) onwards. In the 1960s, the debate about the authenticity of the Lantingji Xu was intensified along with discoveries of more calligraphy rubbings and antique documentations. Much of the debate upon the authenticity of the Lantingji Xu surviving manuscripts is base upon the historical development of Chinese script styles, and whether Wang Xizhi could have written in a calligraphic style which seems to be much more typical of running style script from a time centuries later than Eastern Jin. Some of the answers to questions about authenticity are approached through the means of examining Chinese rubbings from stones carved in various calligraphic styles. Typically the stone inscriptions last much longer than the paper versions, and so may contribute to the general understanding of Chinese script styles, and particularly the role or authenticity of Lantingji Xu as part of this process.

Questions of authenticity
Due to the loss of the original Lantingji Xu, questions have been raised as to whether the surviving copies are true copies, or based on a mere reconstruction. The voice of forgery, with a key representative Guo Moruo (1892 – 1978), the first President of the Chinese Academy of Sciences, claims the Running Style only matured after the Tang dynasty as the artworks and records around the Han to Jin Dynasty imply a heavy dependence of using the Clerical script (evolved around 300 BCE) instead of the Running style, such examples include the stone inscriptions demonstrated in Figure 3 and 4. Moreover, the earliest anecdotes collection in China Shishuo Xinyu (“A New Account of Tales of the World”), annotated by writer Liu Xiaobiao (463 – 521), asserted that the preface written by Wang was actually named Linhe Xu (“The Preface to the Riverside Gathering”). The content of the Linhe Xu recorded in the Shishuo Xinyu, comparing with the Lantingji Xu manuscript, was shortened by a hundred and sixty-seven characters in the middle paragraph but added on forty more characters at the end. Guo also stated that the emotions manifested in the preface was overly pessimistic for an aristocrat so that it was not a true reflection of Wang’s temperament. As a result, by the early 1970s, the conclusion was almost reached that the Lantingji Xu scroll was a work forged by Wang’s descendant.

Role of rubbings
Reproduction of inscriptions on stone (or other depictions on other hard surfaces) through a process of rubbing at the surface, using a combination of ink and paper or other absorbent material has a long history in China, and has been central to cultural preservation and understanding, including the case of the Langting introduction. The discussions around the Orchid pavilion preface, revived from the 1980s, with supporters of Wang’s Langtingji Xu countering the above arguments with rubbing examples such as Figure 5 and 6, suggesting the formation of the Running Style was already completed before Wang’s time. In addition, since the preface was named by the later ages of Wang, it is not surprising that more than one name may exist pointing to the same work. In fact, before Liu Xiaobiao’s annotations, the earlier version of the Shishuo Xinyu compiled by the first editor Liu Yiqing (403 – 444) was already referring to the preface by Wang as Lantingji Xu The revision of the content may also be understandable as a common practice applied in the historical annotated books like the Shishuo Xinyu. When it comes to Wang’s ideology, by the time the preface was created, Wang was in his early fifties who had experienced chaos of the wars and disintegration of his nation. Hence, some scholars proposed that rather than pessimism, the content should be explained as a reflection of Wang’s Confucius, Buddhist and Taoist influences instead. These arguments, as a result, led to a broader recognition nowadays that the Lantingji Xu was originally produced by Wang.

Text translation

Bibliography

Further reading 
 Willetts, William. Chinese Calligraphy: Its History and Aesthetic Motivation. Hong Kong: Oxford University, 1981.
 Nakata, Yujiro. "The Masterpieces of Wang Xizhi and Wang Xianzhi." In Chinese Calligraphy, edited by Yujiro Nakata. Translated by Jeffery Hunter, 116 - 118. New York, Tokyo and Kyoto: Weatherhill/Tankosha, 1983.
 China Heritage Quarterly. "Orchid Pavilion: An Anthology of Literary Representations." Last modified October 19, 2015. http://www.chinaheritagequarterly.org/scholarship.php?searchterm=017_orchidpavillion.inc&issue=017.  = Orchid Pavilion: An Anthology of Literary Representations =

See also
Wang Xizhi
Chinese Calligraphy
Classical Chinese poetry
Six Dynasties poetry
Orchid Pavilion Gathering
Kyokusui-no-en

Gallery
Photographic resources related to the Lantingji Xu.

External links 
 Lantingji Xu at China Online Museum
 A model of Lanting Xu 

Chinese calligraphy
Chinese poetry collections
Works of calligraphy